Vincent Muratori (born 3 August 1987) is a French professional footballer who plays as a defender. He began his football career at Monaco.

External links
 
 

1987 births
Living people
People from Orange, Vaucluse
Sportspeople from Vaucluse
Association football defenders
French footballers
France under-21 international footballers
AS Monaco FC players
AS Nancy Lorraine players
Ligue 1 players
Ligue 2 players
Championnat National 2 players
Championnat National 3 players
French people of Italian descent
Footballers from Provence-Alpes-Côte d'Azur